Pay the Piper may refer to:
 "Pay the piper", a paraphrase from the proverb "he who pays the piper calls the tune"
 Pay the Piper (novel), by Adelyn Bushnell
 "Pay the Piper" (The Flash), an episode of The Flash